Laurie L. Patton (born November 14, 1961) is an American academic, author, and poet who serves as the 17th president of Middlebury College.

Early life and education 
Patton was raised in Danvers, Massachusetts, and graduated from Choate Rosemary Hall in Wallingford, Connecticut. She earned a Bachelor of Arts degree from Harvard University, a doctorate from the University of Chicago, and was awarded a Fulbright scholarship in 2000.

Career 
She was the Charles Howard Candler Professor of Early Indian Religions at Emory University before assuming the role of Robert F. Durden Professor of Religion and Dean of Arts and Sciences at Duke University. She was named Middlebury's 17th president on November 18, 2014, and became Middlebury's first woman president upon taking office on July 1, 2015.

Patton regularly teaches in public venues nationally and internationally on interfaith issues, comparative religion, and religion and conflict. In 2008 and 2009 she co-hosted a TV series on "Faith and Feminism" for Atlanta Interfaith Broadcasting. She served as chair of the department from 2000 to 2007, as conveyor of the Religions and the Human Spirit Strategic Plan from 2005 to 2007, and as the Winship Distinguished Research Professor from 2003 to 2006. She was the recipient of Emory’s highest award for teaching, the Emory Williams Award, in 2006.

Works 
She focuses her research on early Indian rituals, narrative and mythology, literary theory in religious studies, and Hinduism in modern India. She has published on the interpretation of early Indian ritual and narrative, comparative mythology, literary theory in the study of religion, women and Hinduism in contemporary India, and religion and conflict.

Her early Indological work applies literary theory and theory of canon to the texts of early India, particularly Vedic texts. Later, she used a theory of metonymy to rethink the application of mantras in early Indian ritual. Her first edited work, Authority, Anxiety, and Canon (1994) surveyed the larger field of Vedic interpretation as it existed in various intellectual contexts throughout India.

She was co-editor on Myth and Method an assessment of the state of the field in comparative mythology. Her co-edited work with Edwin Bryant (2005) brings together for the first time a variety of differing perspectives on the problem of Aryan origins.

Patton has also worked on gender questions, beginning with her edited volume, Jewels of Authority (2002), which examined early feminist stereotypes about women in Indian textual traditions as well as contemporary life. Her recent articles on gender are derived from her present project, the first ethnography of women Sanskritists ever to be undertaken in India.

Her translation of the Bhagavad Gita in the Penguin Classics Series follows a free verse style constrained by eight line stanzas.

She has also published three books of poetry, including House Crossing, which was published in May 2018.

References

1961 births
American Indologists
Living people
Harvard University alumni
Presidents of Middlebury College
Choate Rosemary Hall alumni
University of Chicago Divinity School alumni
Emory University faculty
Duke University faculty
Hindu studies scholars
Religious studies scholars
American translators
Bard College faculty
People from Danvers, Massachusetts
Jewish American academics
Jewish American writers
American women academics
Women heads of universities and colleges
American women non-fiction writers
21st-century American Jews
21st-century American women
Fulbright alumni